David Ngodiga (born 23 October 1962) is a Nigerian former footballer. He competed in the men's tournament at the 1988 Summer Olympics.

References

External links
 
 

1962 births
Living people
Nigerian footballers
Nigeria international footballers
Olympic footballers of Nigeria
Footballers at the 1988 Summer Olympics
Place of birth missing (living people)
Association football goalkeepers
NEPA Lagos players